Fort Deshler, located near Egypt, Lehigh County, Pennsylvania, USA, was a French and Indian War era frontier fort established in 1760 to protect settlers from Indian attacks. The fort was near the location of what is now the intersection of Pennsylvania Route 145 and Chestnut Street, between Egypt and Coplay.

The fort was built by Adam Deshler, who was employed during the French and Indian War furnishing provisions for provincial forces. Adjoining the building was a large wooden building, suitable as barracks for 20 soldiers and for storing military supplies.

There appears to be no evidence that the fort was either garrisoned with provincial troops or served any military purpose beyond functioning as a place of refuge and rendezvous for settlers of the region.

The fort remained in the Deshler family until 1899, when the building and its remaining  of property were sold to the Coplay Cement Company for $100,000.

The historian Charles Rhoads Roberts, in his 1914 History of Lehigh County Pennsylvania and a Genealogical and Biographical Records of its Families, wrote the following about Fort Deshler:

Fort Deshler was not preserved, and stood in ruins until it collapsed around 1940. Its location is commemorated by a Pennsylvania Historical and Museum Commission marker.

See also
Lehigh County Historical Society
List of Forts in the United States
Whitehall Parkway

Notes

References

1760 establishments in the Thirteen Colonies
Deshler
Deshler
Buildings and structures in Lehigh County, Pennsylvania
Deshler